Dmitri Znakharenko (born 4 August 1993) is a Belarusian professional ice hockey player currently an unrestricted free agent. He most recently played for Amur Khabarovsk in the Kontinental Hockey League (KHL) and the Belarusian national team.

Playing career
Following his sixth season in the KHL with HC Dinamo Minsk, Znakharenko left as a free agent to sign a one-year deal with Amur Khabarovsk on 11 June 2021.

International play
He represented Belarus at the 2021 IIHF World Championship.

References

External links

1993 births
Living people
Amur Khabarovsk players
Belarusian ice hockey defencemen
HC Dinamo Minsk players
HK Gomel players
Sportspeople from Gomel
Yunost Minsk players